Treswithian Downs is a hamlet north of Treswithian, Cornwall, England, United Kingdom.

References

Hamlets in Cornwall